Said bin Taimur (13 August 1910 – 19 October 1972) was the 13th Sultan of Muscat and Oman from 10 February 1932 until he was deposed on 23 July 1970 by his son Qaboos bin Said.

He was a member of the House of Al Said who in 1932 became the Sultan of Muscat and Oman, succeeding his father Taimur bin Feisal who had abdicated for financial reasons. The 21-year-old Said inherited an administration that was in debt. He consolidated power, with the help of the British SAS, and regained control of the tribal interior, bringing together Muscat and Oman. Once the country was united, Said left the capital of Muscat and resided in a coastal town in Dhofar. Muscat and Oman became fully sovereign and independent states in 1951 with him as ruler.

Early life and education
Said was born in 1910. He attended Mayo College at Ajmer in Rajputana, India, from 1922–1927 where he mastered English and Urdu. Upon his return to Muscat in May 1927, it was suggested he attend Beirut to further his education. His father, Sultan Taimur bin Feisal, feared that by sending him to Beirut, he would be influenced by Christianity.

Said’s father was strongly against him learning the ways of the Western world and speaking English. When Said was younger, his father found Sa’id and his brother Nadir possessing an English primer, and he ordered all their books be burned. Instead of sending Said to Beirut, his father sent him to Baghdad to study Arabic literature and history for a year.

Early political career 
After completing his year-long study in Baghdad, Said participated in the Omani government upon his return home. He became the president of the Council of Ministers in August 1929. Sultan Taimur’s inability to govern the state affairs of Oman created an opportunity for a new leader. The British were very fond of Said and during February 1932, at the age of 21, Said became the new crowned Sultan. Sultan Said inherited a country that was heavily in debt to Britain and British India. In order to break away from Britain and maintain autonomy, his country needed to regain economic independence. Therefore, beginning in 1933, he controlled the budget of the state until being overthrown in 1970.

Family affairs 
In 1936, Said married his second wife, Mezoon al-Mashani (cousin of his first wife, Fatima) who in 1940 gave birth to Said's only son and heir Qaboos.

Said had three children

 Sultan Qaboos bin Said Al-Said
 Sayyida Hujaima bint Sa’id bin Taimur Al-Sa’id
 Sayyida Umaima bint Sa’id bin Taimur Al-Sa’id

Reign

Accession 
On his accession, he inherited the remains of the Omani Empire, which included the neighbouring provinces of Oman and Dhofar, as well as the last remnants of an overseas empire, including Gwadar in the Arabian Sea. Nevertheless, his petroleum-rich country also had long established ties with the United Kingdom, based on a 1798 Treaty of Friendship, and had been a British protectorate since 1891. He also inherited an administration that was in debt.

Foreign affairs 
Once he became Sultan, Said maintained a friendly relationship with the United States. In 1938, President Franklin Delano Roosevelt invited Said and his father to visit the United States. Said landed in San Francisco and began a tour from California to Washington, D.C. During his visit to the White House, Roosevelt presented him with two books he had written. Said toured the FBI Headquarters, and laid a wreath upon George Washington’s tomb, at Mount Vernon.

During World War II, the Sultan cooperated readily with the British; several Royal Air Force landing fields were constructed between Salalah in Dhofar and Mascat. This allowed the channels of supply to remain open between Britain and the Allies.

Leadership 
Oil wealth would have allowed Said to modernize his country. He secured British recognition of its independence in 1951. Nevertheless, he also faced serious internal opposition, from Imam Ghalib bin Ali, a religious leader of Oman, who claimed power in the sultanate for himself. The Imam's revolt in Jebel Akhdar was suppressed in 1955, with British help, but this in turn earned Said the animosity of Saudi Arabia, which supported the Imam, and of Egypt, which regarded British involvement in suppressing the revolt as not conducive to the cause of Arab nationalism. In 1957, these two countries supported a renewed revolt by the Imam, which was similarly suppressed by 1959.

In 1958 Said sold Gwadar to Pakistan for $1 million, while in 1967 Britain returned the Khuriya Muriya Islands.

Said became more reclusive from his people and country. In 1965, after making concessions to export oil with Iraq, Iran and Britain, he did little to improve the life of his people. The benefits of this deal would not come to fruition until his was deposed in 1970 in a palace coup. 

In 1965, the province of Dhofar revolted, this time with the support of the People's Republic of China and some of the nationalist Arab states, followed by an assassination attempt in 1966. It had a marked effect on Said, causing him to become even more erratic in governing the country. It was forbidden to smoke in public, to play football, to wear sunglasses or to speak to anyone for more than 15 minutes. No one was safe from the sultan's paranoia, not even his own son, Qaboos, who was kept under virtual house arrest at the Sultan's palace in Salalah.

Before he was overthrown in 1970, because of his backwards policies, Oman had an under 5 mortality rate of around 25%. Trachoma, venereal disease and malnutrition were widespread. There were only three schools, the literacy rate was 5%, and there were only  of paved roads.

Deposition 
Qaboos returned from his educational studies in the  United Kingdom at the Royal Military Academy, and a year of service in the British Army infantry in 1964, and was placed under house arrest. Said did not speak to his son during the last 14 months before the coup, even though they lived in the same palace.

On 23 July 1970 at the Sultan’s palace in Salalah, Qaboos executed a successful coup against his father with the help of the British and his uncle, and exiled his father to the United Kingdom. Said lived his last two years at the Dorchester Hotel in London. He was originally buried in Brookwood Cemetery, Woking, Surrey, England. His remains were then disinterred and transported back to Oman, and he was buried in the royal cemetery in Muscat.

Honours
Hon. Knight Grand Commander of the Order of the Indian Empire (GCIE: 1 January 1945; Hon. KCIE: 30 March 1938)
Hon. Knight Grand Cross of the Order of St. Michael and St. George (GCMG): 1965

Ancestry

Sources 
 Harris M. Lentz III, Heads of States and Governments: A Worldwide Encyclopedia of Over 2,300 Leaders, 1945 through 1992. McFarland & Company, Inc., 1994, p. 604. .

External links  
Omani Ministry of Foreign Affairs
The Death of the Last Feudal Arab State
Sultan Said touring British tanks

References 

1910 births
1972 deaths
20th-century rulers in Asia
20th-century Omani people
Al Said dynasty
Burials at Brookwood Cemetery
Honorary Knights Grand Cross of the Order of St Michael and St George
Honorary Knights Grand Commander of the Order of the Indian Empire
Omani Ibadi Muslims
People from Dhofar Governorate
People from Muscat, Oman
Sons of Omani sultans
Sultans of Oman
World War II political leaders